Bø may refer to the following:

Places

Norway
Of places in Norway, Bø most commonly refers to:

 Bø, Telemark, a municipality in Telemark county in Southern Norway, population 5,977. Home of the main campus of the University of South-Eastern Norway and the Bø Sommarland water park.
 Bø, Nordland, a municipality in Nordland county in Northern Norway, population 2,569

It may also refer to:
Bø, Andøy, a village in Andøy Municipality in Nordland county
Bø, Drangedal, a village in Drangedal Municipality in Telemark county
Bø, Hordaland, a former municipality in Hordaland county (also called Hordabø)
Bø, Nordland (village), a village in Bø Municipality in Nordland county
Bø, Sortland, a village in Sortland Municipality in Nordland county
Bø, Steigen, a village in Steigen Municipality in Nordland county
Bø, Telemark (village), a village in Bø Municipality in Telemark county
Bø, Troms, a village in Skånland Municipality in Troms county
Bø, Vestvågøy, a village in Vestvågøy Municipality in Nordland county
Bø Station, a railway station in Bø Municipality in Telemark county
Bø Church (Hyllestad), a church in Hyllestad Municipality in Vestland county
Bø Church (Nordland), a church in Bø Municipality in Nordland county
Bø Church (Telemark), a church in Bø Municipality in Telemark county
Old Bø Church, a historic church in Bø Municipality in Telemark county

People
Alisha Bø, a Norwegian actress
Egil á Bø, a Faroese football defender who plays for EB/Streymur and the Faroe Islands national football team
Finn Bø, a Norwegian songwriter, revue writer, playwright, journalist, and theatre critic
Johannes Thingnes Bø, a Norwegian biathlete
Tarjei Bø, a Norwegian professional biathlete